Tommy Boyle may refer to:
Tommy Boyle (footballer, born 1886) (1886–1940), football player who played for Barnsley, Burnley, and Wrexham
Tommy Boyle (footballer, born 1901) (1901–1972), football player who played for Sheffield United, Manchester United, and Northampton Town
Thomas Boyle (1775–1825), U.S. Navy officer
Thomas Boyle (badminton), Irish badminton player